Anthea Hamilton (born 1978) is a British artist who graduated from the Royal College of Art and was one of four shortlisted for the 2016 Turner Prize and responsible for the show's most popular exhibit, Project For Door. She is known for creating strange and surreal artworks and large-scale installations.

Her exhibitions have included Sorry I'm Late at Firstsite.

In 2017 she became the first black woman to be awarded a commission to create a work for Tate Britain's Duveen Galleries, and according to Alex Farquharson, Tate Britain's director, Hamilton has made a "unique contribution to British and international art with her visually playful and thoughtful works". Her sculptures feature collage-like images which reuse images from her previous works.

Early life 
Hamilton was born in 1978 in London, where she lives and works. She expressed no interest in becoming an artist as a child and she told her mother at an early age that she wanted to be an accountant, because of her love for maths.

Solo exhibitions 

 2018: The New Life, Secession, Vienna, Austria
 2018: The Squash, Tate Britain, London, UK 
 2015: Donuts, Fig-2, ICA, London, England 
 2014: LOVE (with Nicholas Byrne), Glasgow International, Glasgow, Scotland
 2013: LET’S GO!, Bloomberg Space, London, England
 2012: Kabuki, The Tanks, Tate Modern, London, England
 2009: Calypsos (in collaboration with Nicholas Byrne), Studio Voltaire, Zoo Art Fair, London, UK, Anthea Hamilton, Ibid Projects, London, UK
 2009: Spaghetti Hoops (curated by Jill Gasparina and Caroline Soyez-Petithomme), La Salle de bains, Lyon, FR 
 Turnhalle (Gymnasium), Kunstverein Freiburg, Freiburg, DE 
 2008: Gymnasium, Chisenhale Gallery, London, UK 
 2007: Anthea Hamilton and Thomas Kratz, Mary Mary, Glasgow, UK
 2007: Cut-outs, Galerie Fons Welters, Amsterdam, The Netherlands
 2007: Art Statements Art Basel 38, Basel, Switzerland 
 2006: Solo Presentation, Liste 06: The Young Art Fair, Basel, Switzerland
 2005: How Deep Is Your Love?, Vision On, London, UK

References

1978 births
Artists from London
Living people
British artists
Black British artists
21st-century British women artists
British contemporary artists